Tabaluga is a German-Australian animated television series produced by Yoram Gross Film Studios and Yoram Gross-EM.TV, based on the character of the same name created by Peter Maffay. In this series, Tabaluga is the last of the dragons and the crown-prince of Greenland, a magical place inhabited by talking animals of many different species. Tabaluga must defend his home from two rival kingdoms on either side of Greenland; a frigid arctic tundra, ruled by the evil snowman Arktos and a searing desert, ruled by an evil sand-spirit named Humsin. It was shown on Seven Network in Australia and ZDF in Germany. It was also shown on the Fox Family Channel in the United States.

Plot
The series focusses on Tabaluga, the last dragon living in Greenland, a land occupied by intelligent, talking animals. As a dragon he is tasked with defending Greenland against the evil snowman Arktos and the desert spirit Humsin.

Characters

Residents of Greenland
 Tabaluga: A small green dragon who is the main protagonist of the series. He is the prince (and later the king) of Greenland. Son of the late Tyrion. Voiced by Jamie Oxenbould. In Germany he is voiced by Björn Schalla in Season 1 and Dietmar Wunder in Seasons 2 and 3.
 Happy: A snow hare who lives in Greenland and is one of Tabaluga's best friends. Voiced by Robyn Moore, and by Sabine Manke in German.
 Digby: A mole from Greenland who wears glasses and one of Tabaluga's good friends. In Germany, he is voiced by Edeltraud Esner in Seasons 1 and 2 and by Santiago Ziesmer in Season 3.
 Nessaja: A giant turtle who acts as a mentor and advisor to Tabaluga. Voiced by Inken Sommer in German.
 Buzz: A bee and one of Tabaluga's good friends.
 Shouhu: An owl who can see the events of Greenland through his crystal ball. He was Arktos' prisoner and advisor under Tyrion's orders in Season 1 to make sure Arktos will not become too great of a threat. At the end of the season, James accidentally helps him escape. After that, Shouhu becomes another mentor and advisor to Tabaluga. 
 Tyrion: The previous ruler of Greenland and father of Tabaluga. When he died, he turned into a star, like all dragons. He occasionally appears to Tabaluga in spirit form to offer him some advice.
 Ruby: A hummingbird and a best friend of Buzz and Digby.

Iceworld
 Arktos: The main antagonist and Tabaluga's arch-enemy. He is an evil snowman who aims to make Greenland a frozen wasteland. He is also the king of Iceworld. He has a hall containing animals who have been frozen by him and is fond of ice cream. Despite his hatred for Tabaluga, he has sometimes teamed up with him when the situation called for it. Voiced by Keith Scott in English and Frank Ciazynski in German.
 James: The polite and gentle penguin who serves Arktos and pilots his master's transport, The Arktoplane. When the penguins of Iceworld temporarily left the evil snowman, James was the only one who remained at his side. In Germany, he is voiced by Eberhard Prüter.
 Attila: A walrus and Arktos' cook.
 Vultur: A reconnaissance spy and messenger for Arktos, but then changed allegiance to Humsin. Afterward, he turns back to Arktos.
 Rex: Arktos' pet shark, who often tries to eat his carrot nose, until it escaped at the end of Season 1.
 Lilly (or Lilli): A sculpture created by Arktos. When Tabaluga saw Lilly for the first time, he immediately had a strange but wonderful emotion he couldn't explain to himself – all he could think or dream about was Lilly. When he succeeded to free Lilly from the evil snowman's ice palace and bring her to life with the power of his fire, they were both able to embrace the love they felt for each other. 
 Queen Isadora: An Ice Fairy who has been waiting for a snowman for years. She was later defeated by the Good Queen in the episode, "Arktos' Last Gasp".
 Polar Bears: Iceworlds residents, many feature as henchmen.
 Seals: Iceworlds residents, many employed as serving and auxiliary staff.
 Penguins: Iceworlds residents, led by James many are employed as staff in Arctos' palace.

Desert Realm
 Humsin: Tabaluga's second archenemy. He is the ruler of the desert realm, willing to make Greenland into a desert. At times, he and Arktos find themselves at odds. Much like Arktos is fond of ice cream, Humsin is fond of salty potato chips. He appears as a whirlwind of sand. He only appeared in season 2.
 Kayo: An accident-prone Chameleon who worked for Humsin, but later works for Arktos. In the end, he's a new resident of Greenland. Voiced by Troy Planet.
 Hyena: A Spotted Hyena who has a tendency to laugh at Kayo's misfortunes and other things that aren't funny.
 Ostrich: An accountant and a female ostrich. Worker for Humsin.
 Sally: A female salamander and the leader of the Tribe of Salamanders. She only appeared in the episode, "The Lost Dragon."

Episodes

Season 1 (1997–1998)

Season 2 (2001–2002)

Season 3 (2003–2004)

Animated movie
Following the conclusion of the third season in 2004, a Christmas cartoon film, "Tabaluga und Leo" (engl. "Tabaluga and Leo"), based on the TV cartoon series aired in 2005, serving a sequel to the animated series.

It is a celebration of Greenland Day for Greenland and Christmas Eve for humans. An orphaned boy named Leo who is having no luck getting a foster family decides to run away and enters a portal into Iceworld. During a search for some mountain roses to complete the Greenland festival, Tabaluga rescues Leo from Arktos and takes him to join the festival. Arktos and James intensify Leo's clumsiness in order to swipe his toy to develop a new automated weapon. The damage Leo caused to a green crystal forces Tabaluga to go on an urgent quest for a new one, Leo by his side. When Tabaluga procures the new green crystal, Arktos kidnaps Leo to complete the essential part of his new weapon. Tabaluga slips into Ice Town, rescues Leo and returns in time to save the Greenland festival. Arktos launches his new automated weapon on Greenland, but Tabaluga and Leo repel it. Finally Tabaluga persuades Leo to go back to his world and join his new foster parents.

Game Show

Tabaluga tivi

Movie 

Tabaluga (2018)

References

External links

1990s Australian animated television series
2000s Australian animated television series
1997 German television series debuts
2004 German television series endings
Australian children's animated fantasy television series
German children's animated fantasy television series
Fox Family Channel original programming
Seven Network original programming
TG4 original programming
ZDF original programming
English-language television shows
German-language television shows
Animated television series about dragons